St. Barbara Catholic Church is a parish of the Roman Catholic Church in Cleveland, Ohio, within the Diocese of Cleveland.

The red brick parish church, designed by H.C. Gabele, is a local landmark. It is a GNIS named feature. The church, rectory and convent buildings are listed together as a Cleveland Designated Landmark.

The parish was established in 1905.

History

Closure controversy

On 4 April 2006, titular Bishop Richard Lennon was appointed Bishop of Cleveland by Pope Benedict XVI. In 2009, Bishop Lennon undertook a massive downsizing, ordering the closing of 50 parishes throughout the diocese, citing demographic shifts, the ongoing priest shortage, and maintenance costs. This led to outcry, however, not only from parishioners but from civil authorities.

The suppression of 13 of the closed parishes, among them St. Barbara's, was reversed in a ruling by the Congregation for the Clergy announced 7 March 2012. The Associated Press reported on the importance of this church to the inner city neighborhood.

On 12 March 2012, the Diocesan Department of Communications announced that, "The Diocese has not formally received from the Vatican any decrees from the Congregation of Clergy concerning parish appeals; subsequently, no response is available at this time." On 14 March 2012, Lennon, through a press release from the Diocesan Department of Communications announced that, "As indicated in my previous statement, I promised to inform you when I had received from the Vatican Congregation for Clergy decrees associated with parish appeals. The decrees arrived on Wednesday, March 14, 2012. The process to review these rulings will now be undertaken with my advisors." He further announced, on 27 March 2012, that, "With the help of a number of advisors – including members of the clergy, laity and experts in church law – I am carefully studying and seeking to fully understand the decrees. I can assure you that this is not nearly as clear-cut as it may appear on the surface. Although the decrees are brief in length, they are deep in underlying meaning and I continue to receive significant input and clarification."

St. Barbara was among eleven parishes re-established in 2012. On 27 June 2012, Lennon announced the appointment of Father Joseph Hilinski as Pastor.

The first Mass since the reopening of the church was celebrated Sunday, 22 July 2012.

Priests

References

Polish-American culture in Cleveland
Christian organizations established in 1905
Roman Catholic churches completed in 1951
Churches in the Roman Catholic Diocese of Cleveland
Roman Catholic churches in Cleveland
20th-century Roman Catholic church buildings in the United States
1905 establishments in Ohio